Latitude Zero may refer to:
equator
Latitude Zero (film), a 1969 tokusatsu film
Latitude Zero (novel), the twelfth book in the Deathlands series